Evodinus is a genus of beetles in the family Cerambycidae, containing the following species:

 Evodinus borealis (Gyllenhal, 1827)
 Evodinus clathratus (Fabricius, 1793)
 Evodinus lanhami Lewis, 1976
 Evodinus monticola (Randall, 1838)

References

Lepturinae